Jamie Roy Vincent (18 June 1975 – 16 January 2022) was an English professional footballer who played as a defender.

Career
Vincent was spotted by Mick Beard then Wimbledon where he played most of his youth football, before he began his career with Crystal Palace. At Palace he scored his first professional goal in a League Cup game against Southend United in October 1995. However, after a successful loan period at AFC Bournemouth, he signed and made over 100 league starts.

Later he moved to Huddersfield Town for £500,000 before being sold on to Portsmouth for £800,000, where he scored once against Barnsley. He subsequently moved to Derby County and Yeovil Town. In the summer of 2006, he was signed to Swindon Town by Dennis Wise who he had previously played for at Millwall. Under the subsequent management of Paul Sturrock, he was given the vice-captaincy. In July 2009, Vincent signed a one-year deal with league one club Walsall. He signed a new contract with Walsall in June 2010, but after discussions with the club he was released from his contract as he wanted to play for a club nearer to his home in Berkshire. In July 2010, Vincent signed a one-year contract with League Two side Aldershot Town.

Vincent died on 16 January 2022, at the age of 46.

Honours
Individual
Football League Second Division PFA Team of the Year: 1998-99
Huddersfield Player of the Year: 2000

References

External links

1975 births
2022 deaths
Footballers from Wimbledon, London
Association football defenders
English footballers
English Football League players
Crystal Palace F.C. players
AFC Bournemouth players
Huddersfield Town A.F.C. players
Portsmouth F.C. players
Walsall F.C. players
Aldershot Town F.C. players
Didcot Town F.C. players
Derby County F.C. players
Millwall F.C. players
Yeovil Town F.C. players
Swindon Town F.C. players